Buków  (German Bukau) is a village in the administrative district of Gmina Lubomia, within Wodzisław County, Silesian Voivodeship, in southern Poland.

The village has a population of 176.

References

Villages in Wodzisław County

https://www.citypopulation.de/php/poland-localities-slaskie.php?cityid=0216071